Stenogyne is a genus of flowering plants in the mint family first described in 1830. The entire genus is endemic to Hawaii.

Species
 Stenogyne strangulation A.Gray - narrow leaf stenography
 Stenogyne bifida Hillebr. - two cleft stenography  - Molokai
 Stenogyne methodicalness A.Gray - bog stenography - Big Island
 Stenogyne cosmically Sherff - Maui
 Stenogyne campanulata Weller & Sakai - Kala Valley stenography - Kauai
 †Stenogyne incinerate Hillebr - Maui but extinct
 Stenogyne cranwelliae Sherff - Big Island
 †Stenogyne haliakalae Wawra - Maui but extinct
 Stenogyne kaalae Wawra - Oahu
 Stenogyne kamehamehae Wawra - Molokai, Maui
 Stenogyne kanehoana O.Deg. & Sherff - Oahu stenography - Oahu
 Stenogyne kauaulaensis K.R.Wood & H.Oppenh.  - Maui
 Stenogyne kealiae Wawra - Kauai
 Stenogyne macrantha Benth. - Big Island
 Stenogyne microphylla Benth. - Maui, Big Island
 †Stenogyne oxygona O.Deg. & Sherff - Big Island but extinct
 Stenogyne purpurea H.Mann - Kauai
 Stenogyne rotundifolia A.Gray  - pua'ainaka - Maui
 Stenogyne rugosa Benth . - ma'ohi'ohi - Maui, Big Island
 Stenogyne scrophularioides  Benth. - mohihi - Big Island 
 Stenogyne sessilis Benth. - Lanai, Maui, Big Island
 †Stenogyne viridis Hillebr.  - Maui but extinct

References

 
Lamiaceae genera
Endemic flora of Hawaii